The 2022 Renfrewshire Council elections took place on 5 May 2022, as part of the 2022 Scottish local elections on the same day as the 31 other Scottish local authorities were up for election. The election used the 12 wards created under the Local Governance (Scotland) Act 2004 and last changed as part of the as a result of the 2015-16 Boundary Commission review, with 43 councillors being elected. Each ward elected either 3 or 4 members, using the STV electoral system.

At the last election in 2017, the SNP won the most seats and formed a minority administration taking over from the previous Labour majority administration. This election saw the SNP grow their number of seats to 21, one short of a majority, along with seats gains by Labour to bring them up to 15. The Conservatives lost seats, reducing their representation to 5. Liberal Democrats retained their single seat and Independents on the council were reduced to also a single seat.

Background

Retiring councillors

Results

|- class="unsortable" class="sortbottom"
| style="background-color:#EAECF0; font-weight:bold; text-align:center;" colspan="2" |Total
| style="background-color:#EAECF0; text-align:left;" |43
| style="background-color:#EAECF0; text-align:left;" | Electorate: 141,764
| style="background-color:#EAECF0; text-align:left;" | Turnout: 62,973(44.4%)
| style="background-color:#EAECF0; text-align:left;" | Total valid: 61,418
| style="background-color:#EAECF0; text-align:left;" |100.00
| style="background-color:#EAECF0; text-align:left;" | 
| style="background-color:#EAECF0; text-align:left;" | -

Note: "Votes" are the first preference votes. The net gain/loss and percentage changes relate to the result of the previous Scottish local elections on 5 May 2017. This may differ from other published sources showing gain/loss relative to seats held at dissolution of council.

Ward results

Renfrew North and Braehead
2017: 2xSNP; 1xLab; 1xCon
2022: 2xSNP; 1xLab; 1xCon
2017-2022 Change: No Change

Renfrew South and Gallowhill
2017: 2xSNP; 1xLab;
2022: 2xSNP; 1xLab;
2017-2022 Change: No Change

Paisley Northeast and Ralston
2017: 1xSNP; 1xLab; 1xCon
2022: 1xSNP; 1xLab; 1xCon
2017-2022 Change: No Change

Paisley Northwest
2017: 2xSNP; 1xLab; 1xCon
2022: 2xSNP; 2xLab;
2017-2022 Change: Labour gain one seat from Conservative

Paisley East and Central
2017: 2xSNP; 1xLab
2022: 2xSNP; 1xLab
2017-2022 Change: No change

Paisley Southeast
2017: 1xSNP; 1xLab; 1xIndependent
2022: 2xSNP; 1xLab;
2017-2022 Change: SNP gain one seat from Independent

Paisley Southwest
2017: 2xSNP; 1xLab; 1xLib Dem
2022: 2xSNP; 1xLab; 1xLib Dem
2017-2022 Change: No Change

Johnstone South and Elderslie
2017: 2xSNP; 1xLab; 1xCon
2022: 2xSNP; 2xLab;
2017-2022 Change: Labour gain one seat from Conservative.

Johnstone North, Kilbarchan, Howwood and Lochwinnoch
2017: 1xLab; 1xSNP; 1xCon; 1xIndependent
2022: 2xLab; 1xSNP; 1xIndependent
2017-2022 Change: Labour gain one seat from Conservative

Houston, Crosslee and Linwood
2017: 2xLab; 1xSNP; 1xCon
2022: 2xSNP; 1xLab; 1xCon
2017-2022 Change: SNP gain one seat from Labour.

Bishopton, Bridge of Weir and Langbank
2017: 1xCon; 1xSNP; 1xLab
2022: 1xCon; 1xSNP; 1xLab
2017-2022 Change: No change

Erskine and Inchinnan
2017: 2xSNP; 1xLab; 1xCon
2022: 2xSNP; 1xLab; 1xCon
2017-2022 Change: No change

Changes since Election
November 2022

 At the start of the month Paisley Southeast Labour Cllr and former Labour Group Leader, Eddie Devine, left the party over "backstabbing that’s been going on in the past year or so" in the Labour group.

Halfway through the month, veteran Johnstone South and Elderslie Labour Cllr, John Hood, left the party over becoming "disillusioned" with his party. Hood stated his party "doesn't want him"

Notes

References 

2022
Renfrewshire